The Duchess of Benameji (Spanish:La duquesa de Benamejí) may refer to:

 The Duchess of Benameji (play), a 1932 play by the Spanish writers  Antonio and Manuel Machado
 The Duchess of Benameji (film), a 1949 film adaptation directed by Luis Lucia